The DEEP2 Survey or DEEP2 was a two-phased Redshift survey of the Redshift z=~1 universe (where z= a measure of speed and by extension, the distance from earth).  It used the twin 10 metre Keck telescopes in Hawaii (the world's second largest optical telescope) to measure the spectra and hence the redshifts of approximately 50,000 galaxies. It was the first project to study galaxies in the distant Universe with the resolution of local surveys like the Sloan Digital Sky Survey and was completed in 2013.

References

Observational astronomy
Astronomical surveys
Physical cosmology